Jason Crabb is the eponymous Grammy-winning debut album from the artist of the same name. The album was released on June 30, 2009 through Spring Hill Music Group.

Track listing
 "Somebody Like Me" (Michael Boggs, Neil Thrasher) — 4:26
 "Walk on Water" (Vicky McGehee, Bobby Pinson, Trent Tomlinson) — 3:58
 "Daystar" (featuring Gaither Vocal Band) (Steve Richardson) — 5:28
 "Worth It All" (Gerald Crabb) — 3:30
 "I Will Love You" (Scott Krippayne, Sue C. Smith) — 3:56
 "Through the Fire" (Gerald Crabb) — 3:47
 "Sometimes I Cry" (Gerald Crabb) — 3:11
 "Hope for Me Yet" (Marc Broussard, Radney Foster, Justin Tocket) — 3:52
 "One Day at a Time" (James Rueger, Tony Wood) — 3:42
 "Ellsworth" (featuring Vince Gill) (Michael William Dulaney, Wendell Mobley, Neil Thrasher) — 3:50
 "No Love Lost" (Gordon Kennedy, Tommy Sims) — 4:35
 "Forever's End" (Randy Goodrum, Carl Utbult) — 4:23

Awards
Crabb's debut album won a Grammy Award for Best Southern/Country/Bluegrass Gospel Album at the 52nd Annual Grammy Awards. Also, at the 41st GMA Dove Awards, the album was nominated for a Dove Award for Country Album of the Year. The song "Somebody Like Me" was nominated for Song of the Year and Country Recorded Song of the Year, winning the latter.

Chart performance
The album peaked at #62 on Billboard 200 and #2 on Billboard's Christian Albums. It stayed 31 weeks on the charts.

Personnel
 Adapted from AllMusic:
 Gary Burnett - guitar
 Shawnel Corley - backing vocals
 Tre Corley - keyboards
 Adam Crabb - harmonica, backing vocals
 Justin Ellis - keyboards
 Shannon Forrest - drums
 Paul Franklin - steel guitar
 Gus Gaches - backing vocals
 Vince Gill - backing vocals
 Rob Hajacos - fiddle
 Carl Hergesell - keyboards
 Sonya Isaacs - backing vocals
 Paul Leim - drums
 Brent Mason - electric guitar
 Jerry McPherson - guitar
 Jeremy Medkiff - banjo, acoustic guitar
 Gordon Mote - keyboards
 Duncan Mullins - bass
 The Nashville String Machine - strings
 Dan Needham - drums
 Larry Paxton - bass
 Mike Rojas - keyboards
 Scott Sanders - pedal steel guitar
 Debbie Selby - backing vocals
 Tommy Sims - bass, acoustic guitar
 Zachary Smith - banjo, electric guitar
 Bryan Sutton - acoustic guitar, mandolin
 Bruce Watkins - fiddle
 John Willis - acoustic guitar
 Suzanne Young - backing vocals

References

External links
Jason Crabb in Amazon.com

2009 albums